Hir Elmosil  is a Syrian village located in Tell Salhab Subdistrict in Al-Suqaylabiyah District, Hama.  According to the Syria Central Bureau of Statistics (CBS), Hir Elmosil had a population of 579 in the 2004 census.

References 

Populated places in al-Suqaylabiyah District